Man from Music Mountain is a 1938 American Western film directed by Joseph Kane and starring Gene Autry, Smiley Burnette, and Carol Hughes. Written by Betty Burbridge and Luci Ward, based on a story by Bernard McConville, the film is about a singing cowboy who fights corrupt land developers who try to cheat honest ranchers who are unaware of the gold lying beneath their land.

Cast
 Gene Autry as Gene Autry
 Smiley Burnette as Frog Millhouse
 Carol Hughes as Helen Foster
 Sally Payne as Patsy
 Ivan Miller as John Scanlon
 Ed Cassidy as William Brady
 Lew Kelly as Bowdie Bill
 Howard Chase as Abbott
 Al Terr as Buddy Harmon
 Frankie Marvin as Larry Higgins
 Earl Dwire as Lew Martin
 Lloyd Ingraham as George Harmon
 Lillian Drew as Mrs. Chris
 Al Taylor as Henchman Hank
 Joe Yrigoyen as Henchman Pete
 Polly Jenkins and Her Plowboys as a Musical Group
 Champion as Gene's Horse (uncredited)

Production

Soundtracks
 "There's a Little Deserted Town on the Prairie" (Gene Autry, Johnny Marvin, Fred Rose) by Gene Autry and Cowboys
 "The Man from Music Mountain" (Peter Tinturin, Jack Lawrence, Eddie Cherkose) by Gene Autry, Smiley Burnette, and Cowboys
 "Love, Burning Love" (Gene Autry, Johnny Marvin, Fred Rose) by Smiley Burnette, Frankie Marvin, and an unidentified guitarist
 "All Nice People" (Smiley Burnette) by Smiley Burnette and an unidentified female quartet
 "I'm Beginning to Care" (Gene Autry, Johnny Marvin, Fred Rose) by Gene Autry
 "She Works Third Tub at the Laundry" (Smiley Burnette) by Smiley Burnette and Sally Payne
 "Untitled Instrumental" by Polly Jenkins and Her Plowboys
 "Long, Long Ago" (Thomas Haynes Bayly) by Polly Jenkins and Her Plowboys
 "William Tell Overture" (Gioachino Rossini) by Polly Jenkins and Her Plowboys
 "Good Bye, Pinto" (Gene Autry, Johnny Marvin, Fred Rose) by Gene Autry and Musicians
 "She'll Be Coming 'Round the Mountain" (Traditional)

References
Citations

Bibliography

External links
 
 
 
 

1938 films
1938 Western (genre) films
American Western (genre) films
American black-and-white films
Republic Pictures films
Films directed by Joseph Kane
1930s English-language films
1930s American films